The 1993 World Table Tennis Championships mixed doubles was the 42nd edition of the mixed doubles championship.

Wang Tao and Liu Wei defeated Yoo Nam-kyu and Hyun Jung-hwa in the final by three sets to nil.

Results

See also
List of World Table Tennis Championships medalists

References

-
Mixed doubles table tennis